is a Japanese football player for Kagoshima United FC.

Career
Masaki Sakamoto joined J2 League club Cerezo Osaka in 2015.

In September 2019, Sakamoto joined Maruyasu Okazaki on loan from Kagoshima United. On 15 January 2020 the club announced, that Sakamoto had joined the club permanently.

Club statistics
Updated to 23 February 2018.

References

External links
Profile at Kagoshima United FC

Profile at Cerezo Osaka

1996 births
Living people
Association football people from Hyōgo Prefecture
Japanese footballers
J2 League players
J3 League players
Japan Football League players
Cerezo Osaka players
Cerezo Osaka U-23 players
J.League U-22 Selection players
Kagoshima United FC players
FC Maruyasu Okazaki players
Association football midfielders
People from Akashi, Hyōgo